Siagona is a genus of ground beetles in the family Carabidae. There are more than 80 described species in Siagona, found mainly in Africa, the Mediterranean, and southern Asia.

Species
These 83 species belong to the genus Siagona:

 Siagona angulifrons Bates, 1892
 Siagona angustata Chaudoir, 1843
 Siagona angustipennis Bates, 1892
 Siagona apicalis Andrewes, 1921
 Siagona atrata Dejean, 1825
 Siagona australis Péringuey, 1892
 Siagona baconi Chaudoir, 1876
 Siagona basilewskyi Lecordier, 1970
 Siagona brunnipes Dejean, 1825
 Siagona caffra Boheman, 1848
 Siagona carinata Lecordier, 1978
 Siagona cinctella Chaudoir, 1876
 Siagona conradti Kolbe, 1895
 Siagona crassidens Bates, 1889
 Siagona cyathodera Andrewes, 1921
 Siagona cyclobasis Chaudoir, 1876
 Siagona dageti Lecordier, 1978
 Siagona dejeani Rambur, 1837
 Siagona depressa (Fabricius, 1798)
 Siagona dichroa Lecordier, 1978
 Siagona dilutipes Chaudoir, 1850
 Siagona discoidalis Kolbe, 1895
 Siagona dorsalis Dejean, 1831
 Siagona elegantula Lecordier, 1979
 Siagona europaea Dejean, 1826
 Siagona fabricii Andrewes, 1921
 Siagona ferrugata Lecordier, 1978
 Siagona ferruginea Lecordier, 1970
 Siagona flesus (Fabricius, 1801)
 Siagona fuscipes Bonelli, 1813
 Siagona gerardi Buquet, 1840
 Siagona gilloni Lecordier, 1968
 Siagona gruveli Lecordier, 1968
 Siagona hiekei Lecordier, 1981
 Siagona hovana Fairmaire, 1900
 Siagona induta Chaudoir, 1876
 Siagona insulana Andrewes, 1936
 Siagona inusta Lecordier, 1978
 Siagona jeanneli Lecordier, 1978
 Siagona jenissonii Dejean, 1826
 Siagona kindermanni Chaudoir, 1861
 Siagona kulla Andrewes, 1921
 Siagona leprieuri Lecordier, 1968
 Siagona levasseuri Lecordier, 1970
 Siagona longula Reiche & Saulcy, 1855
 Siagona macrocephala Lecordier, 1970
 Siagona mandibularis Guérin-Méneville, 1838
 Siagona menieri Lecordier, 1973
 Siagona minor Alluaud, 1923
 Siagona navicularis Bänninger, 1933
 Siagona oberleitneri Dejean, 1830
 Siagona obscuripes Chaudoir, 1876
 Siagona pallipes Lecordier, 1970
 Siagona parallela Lecordier, 1968
 Siagona partita Lecordier, 1979
 Siagona peculiariclypeata Hovorka, 2019
 Siagona picea Chaudoir, 1843
 Siagona plana (Fabricius, 1801)
 Siagona plicata Andrewes, 1929
 Siagona polita Andrewes, 1921
 Siagona pubescens Chaudoir, 1850
 Siagona pubigera Chaudoir, 1876
 Siagona pumila Andrewes, 1922
 Siagona punctata (Lecordier, 1977)
 Siagona punctatula Lecordier, 1970
 Siagona punctulata Chaudoir, 1876
 Siagona pygmaea Andrewes, 1921
 Siagona rifensis Alluaud, 1932
 Siagona rubescens Andrewes, 1929
 Siagona rubra Lecordier, 1979
 Siagona rufipes (Fabricius, 1792)
 Siagona rustica Andrewes, 1929
 Siagona senegalensis Dejean, 1831
 Siagona signaticolla Lecordier, 1979
 Siagona simplex Péringuey, 1892
 Siagona sinistra Darlington, 1967
 Siagona sinuata Lecordier, 1979
 Siagona somalia Fairmaire, 1887
 Siagona sublaevis Chaudoir, 1876
 Siagona taggadertensis Junger & Faille, 2011
 Siagona ustulata Lecordier, 1979
 Siagona vanstraeleni Basilewsky, 1962
 Siagona vittata Lecordier, 1970

References

Carabidae genera
Siagoninae